Gifty Acheampong (born 5 November 1999) is Ghanaian women's football forward. She played in the Turkish Women's First League for 1207 Antalya Döşemealtı Belediye Spor with jersey number 19. She was a member of the Ghana women's U-17 team.

Early life
Gifty was born in Koforidua, in the Eastern Region of Ghana on 5 November 1999.

She was abandoned by her parents without knowing them, and was adopted by the petty trader couple Acheapong when she was only one month old. She lost her father at a young age, and things got difficult. She was raised by her adoptive mother during her school years. However, she had to drop out the high school as her mother could no more afford to earn her keep. She decided to concentrate on playing football in order to earn money to take care of herself and support her mother financially.

Club career 
Acheampong began playing football already at the age of ten in the local club Koforidua Gartel SC. She then moved to Accra, where she joined Immigration Ladies FC. She later joined Samaria Ladies now Thunder Queens in 2018, where she served as the club captain from 2019 to 2020.

Beginning of December 2017, the -tall forward  moved to Turkey to join 1207 Antalya Döşemealtı Belediyespor to play in the Turkish Women's First Football League.  In October 2020, she signed for NWFL Premiership side, Rivers Angels F.C.

International career
Acheampong was a member of the Ghana women's national under-17 football team. She took part in four matches of the 2016 FIFA U-17 Women's World Cup - Group D held in Jordan, and scored two goals of three in total.

References

External links

1999 births
Living people
People from Koforidua
Ghanaian women's footballers
Women's association football forwards
1207 Antalya Spor players
Thunder Queens F.C. players
Rivers Angels F.C. players
Ghanaian expatriate women's footballers
Ghanaian expatriate sportspeople in Turkey
Expatriate women's footballers in Turkey
Ghanaian expatriate sportspeople in Ukraine
Expatriate women's footballers in Ukraine
Ghanaian expatriate sportspeople in Nigeria
Expatriate footballers in Nigeria Women Premier League